Cyrtinus beckeri is a species of beetle in the family Cerambycidae. It was described by Howden in 1960 and is found in the United States. It feeds on the Bigtooth maple.

References

Cyrtinini
Beetles described in 1960